Scott Staffanson (born October 1, 1960) is an American politician who is a former member of the Montana House of Representatives. He did not run for re-election in 2018, and his term ended on January 7, 2019.

Early life and education
Staffanson was born on October 1, 1960 in Richland County, Montana. Growing up on his family’s farm, Staffanson went to college at Montana State University, graduating in 1982.

2012 election
Staffanson ran for election in the 2012 Montana House of Representatives election, but withdrew on June 5, 2012 and joined David Halvorson’s campaign as its campaign manager.

Taking office
Staffanson was appointed to the Montana House of Representatives on August 19, 2013 by a vote of Richland and Dawson County lawmakers after the death of David Halvorson.

2014 election
Staffanson ran unopposed in the Republican Party primary and won the election with a marging of almost 60% of the vote.

2016 election
In the 2016 election, Staffanson easily defeated Joel Krautter in the primary and defeated Chris Trumpower in the election.

References 

1960 births
Living people
Members of the Montana House of Representatives
21st-century American politicians